Kotli Loharan may refer to:

Kotli Loharan West, a town in the Punjab province of Pakistan
Kotli Loharan East, a town in the Punjab province of Pakistan